Khatab-e Sofla (also Romanized as Khaţab-e Soflá; also known as Khaţab) is a village in Quri Chay-ye Gharbi Rural District, Saraju District, Maragheh County, East Azerbaijan Province, Iran. At the 2006 census, its population was 167, in 39 families.

References

External links

Towns and villages in Maragheh County